Borova is an urban-type settlement in Izium Raion, Kharkiv Oblast, Ukraine. It hosts the administration of Borova settlement hromada, one of the hromadas of Ukraine. Population: 

Borova is located to the southeast of Kharkiv.

Geography 
Borova is situated on the eastern bank of Oskil Reservoir of the Oskil. 

Distance from Kharkiv via the railway 193 km, by the road 165 km. The core railway station namely Pereddonbasivska (approx. 1,5 km). Boyni and Pydliman are the nearest villages. The distance from Borova to Pydliman is about 2 km.

History 
Borova was a village in the Kharkov Governorate of the Russian Empire. A local newspaper has been published here since 1934. During World War II, it was under German occupation from July 1942 to February 1943.

Since 1968, it has been classified as an urban-type settlement. In January 1989, the population was 7396 people. In January 2013 the population was 5740 people.

Until 18 July 2020, Borova was the administrative center of Borova Raion. The raion was abolished in July 2020 as part of the administrative reform of Ukraine, which reduced the number of raions of Kharkiv Oblast to seven. The area of Borova Raion was merged into Izium Raion.

2022 Russian invasion of Ukraine 

In March 2022, during the battle of Izium, the settlement was occupied by Russian forces. On 3 October 2022, Russian forces fled allowing Ukrainian authorities to subsequently regain control of the settlement during the Kharkiv counteroffensive.

Economy

Transportation
The Central bus-station links villages and cities by the P-78 and P-79 roads. Borova is on the P-79 road which connects Krasnohrad via Izium with Kupiansk and further crosses into Russia. There are local roads as well.

Borova railway station is on the railway connecting Izium and Sloviansk with Kupiansk where it has further access to Kharkiv and to Valuyki and Liski in Russia.

Education 
 High School
 School
 Musical School
 Palace of Culture
 Libraries for children and adults
 Sport complex

References

Urban-type settlements in Izium Raion